Ivor Smith (born 24 July 1931) is a former  Australian rules footballer who played with St Kilda in the Victorian Football League (VFL).

Notes

External links 

Living people
1931 births
Australian rules footballers from Victoria (Australia)
St Kilda Football Club players